Cyperus derreilema is a species of sedge that is endemic to Africa extending from Ethiopia in the north through to Malawi in the south.

The species was first formally described by the botanist Ernst Gottlieb von Steudel in 1842.

See also
 List of Cyperus species

References

derreilema
Plants described in 1842
Taxa named by Ernst Gottlieb von Steudel
Flora of Ethiopia
Flora of Malawi
Flora of Kenya
Flora of Rwanda
Flora of Sudan
Flora of Tanzania